Ulashkivtsi is a village located at the Seret River in Chortkiv Raion (district) of Ternopil Oblast (province in western Ukraine. It belongs to Nahirianka rural hromada, one of the hromadas of Ukraine. Pop. 1,423.

Names
Ulashkivtsi is also known as Ulaszkowce, Ulashkovtse, Ulashkovtsy, Ułaszkowce, and Ulaskowce. Its Austrian-Polish name was Leszkowitz (pronounced Leshkovitz).

History
First mentioned in 1464 the village belonged to the Kamieniec (Kamyanets-Podilskyi) county (powiat) in 16th century and was famous for the trade fairs being held there.

The Basilian Uniate monastery of John the Baptist was built there in early-18th century (sources give 1724 and 1738  as the foundation year.) The monastery holds two thaumaturgic icons: of the Most Holy Virgin and of John the Baptist.

References

External links
 “Ulaszkowce” - Encyclopedia of Jewish Communities in Poland, Volume II (Ulashkivtsi, Ukraine)
 Жарких М.І. Храми Поділля

Villages in Chortkiv Raion